Nicolas Fatio de Duillier  (also spelled Faccio or Facio; 16 February 1664 – 10 May 1753) was a mathematician, natural philosopher, astronomer, inventor, and religious campaigner.  Born in Basel, Switzerland, Fatio mostly grew up in the then-independent Republic of Geneva, of which he was a citizen, before spending much of his adult life in England and Holland.  Fatio is known for his collaboration with Giovanni Domenico Cassini on the correct explanation of the astronomical phenomenon of zodiacal light, for inventing the "push" or "shadow" theory of gravitation, for his close association with both Christiaan Huygens and Isaac Newton, and for his role in the Leibniz–Newton calculus controversy.  He also invented and developed the first method for fabricating jewel bearings for mechanical watches and clocks.

Elected a Fellow of the Royal Society of London at the age of 24, Fatio never achieved the position and reputation that his early achievements and connections had promised.  In 1706 he became involved with a millenarian religious sect, known in London as the "French prophets", and the following year he was sentenced to the pillory for sedition over his role in the publication of the prophecies of Élie Marion, the leader of that sect.  Fatio travelled with the French prophets as a missionary, going as far as Smyrna before returning to Holland in 1713, and finally settling in England.  His extreme religious views harmed his intellectual reputation, but Fatio continued to pursue technological, scientific, and theological researches until his death at the age of 89.

Early life

Family background 
Nicolas Fatio was born in Basel, Switzerland, in 1664, into a family that originated in Italy and settled in Switzerland following the Protestant Reformation.  One of his cousins was the ill-fated Genevan political reformer Pierre Fatio.  Nicolas was the seventh of nine children (two brothers and seven sisters) of Jean-Baptiste and Cathérine Fatio, née Barbaud. Jean-Baptiste had inherited a significant fortune, derived from his father's interests in iron and silver mining, and in 1672 he moved the family to an estate that he had purchased in Duillier, some twenty kilometres from the town of Geneva.  Jean-Baptiste, a devout Calvinist, wished Nicolas to become a pastor, whereas Cathérine, a Lutheran, wanted him to find a place in the court of a Protestant German prince. Instead, the young Nicolas pursued a scientific career.

Nicolas's elder brother, Jean Christophe Fatio, was elected a Fellow of the Royal Society on 3 April 1706. Jean Christophe published in the Philosophical Transactions a description of the solar eclipse that he had observed in Geneva on 12 May of that year. He died at Geneva on 18 October 1720. Jean Christophe was married in 1709 to Catherine, daughter of Jean Gassand of Forcalquier, in Provence.  Catherine's will was proved at London in March 1752.  Nicolas himself was never married.

Education and patronage 

Nicolas Fatio received his elementary schooling at the Collège de Genève, proceeding in 1678 to the Académie de Genève (now the University of Geneva), where he remained until 1680.  At the Academy he came under the influence of the rector, Jean-Robert Chouet, a prominent Cartesian. Before he was eighteen, Fatio wrote to the director of the Paris Observatory, the astronomer Giovanni Domenico Cassini, suggesting a new method of determining the distances to the Sun and Moon from the Earth, as well as an explanation of the form of the rings of Saturn.  With Chouet's support, Fatio travelled to Paris in the spring of 1682 and was warmly received by Cassini.

That same year, Cassini presented his findings on the astronomical phenomenon of zodiacal light.  Fatio repeated Cassini's observations in Geneva in 1684, and in 1685 he offered an important development of Cassini's theory, which was communicated by Chouet in the March 1685 number of Nouvelles de la république des lettres. Fatio's own Lettre à M. Cassini touchant une lumière extraordinaire qui paroît dans le Ciel depuis quelques années ("Letter to Mr. Cassini concerning the extraordinary light that has appeared in the Heavens for some years") was published in Amsterdam in 1686.  There Fatio correctly explained the zodiacal light as sunlight scattered by an interplanetary dust cloud (the "zodiacal cloud") that straddles the ecliptic plane.

Fatio then studied the dilatation and contraction of the eye's pupil.  He described the fibres of the anterior uvea and the choroid in a letter to Edme Mariotte, dated 13 April 1684.  That same year he published an article in the Journal des sçavans on how to improve the fabrication of lenses for the objectives of telescopes.

Also in 1684, Fatio met the Piedmontese Count Fenil, who, having offended the Duke of Savoy and the King of France, had taken refuge in the house of Fatio's maternal grandfather in Alsace and then at Duillier. Fenil confided to Fatio his plan to stage a raid on the beach at Scheveningen to kidnap the Dutch Prince William of Orange. Fenil showed Fatio a letter from the Marquis de Louvois, the French Secretary of State, approving of the kidnapping, offering the king's pardon as recompense for the successful completion of the operation, and enclosing an order for money. Fatio betrayed Fenil's plot to Gilbert Burnet, whom he then accompanied to Holland in 1686 to warn Prince William.

Career in Holland and England 
In Holland, Fatio met Christiaan Huygens, with whom he began to collaborate on mathematical problems concerning the new infinitesimal calculus.  Encouraged by Huygens, Fatio compiled a list of corrections to the published works on differentiation by Ehrenfried Walther von Tschirnhaus. The Dutch authorities wished to reward Fatio, whose mathematical abilities Huygens vouched for, with a professorship. While those plans were delayed, Fatio received permission to visit England in the spring of 1687.

Fatio arrived in England in June 1687, carrying with him the conviction that the two greatest living natural philosophers were Robert Boyle, "for the details of his experiments concerning earthly bodies", and Christiaan Huygens "for physics in general, above all in those areas in which it is involved with mathematics." Fatio hoped to procure Boyle's patronage, and in London he soon made the acquaintance of John Wallis, John Locke, Richard Hampden, and his son John Hampden, among other important figures connected with the Whig party.

Fatio worked out new solutions of the "inverse tangent problem" (i.e.,the solution of ordinary differential equations) and was introduced to the Royal Society by Henri Justel. He began to attend Society's meetings in June of that year, thus learning of the upcoming publication of Newton's Principia.  In the winter of 1687 Fatio went to the University of Oxford, where he collaborated with Edward Bernard, the Savilian Professor of Astronomy, in an investigation into the units of measurement used in the ancient world.

Participation in the Royal Society 

Aged only 24, Fatio was elected fellow of the Royal Society on 2 May 1688. That year, Fatio gave an account of Huygens's mechanical explanation of gravitation before the Royal Society, in which he tried to connect Huygens' theory with Isaac Newton's work on universal gravitation. Fatio's personal prospects seemed to brighten even further as a result of the Glorious Revolution of 1688–9, which marked the ascendancy of the Whigs and culminated with Parliament deposing the Catholic King James II and giving the English throne jointly to James's Protestant daughter Mary and to her husband, the Dutch Prince William of Orange. Fatio also had an opportunity to enhance his intellectual reputation during Huygen's visit to London in the summer of 1689.

Fatio met Newton, probably for the first time, at a meeting of the Royal Society on 12 June 1689.  Newton and Fatio soon became friends and Newton even suggested that the two share rooms in London while Newton attended the post-Revolutionary session of Parliament, to which he had been elected as member for the University of Cambridge. In 1690, Fatio wrote to Huygens outlining his own understanding of the physical cause of gravity, which would later become known as "Le Sage's theory of gravitation".  Soon after that, he read his letter to Huygens before the Royal Society. Fatio's theory, on which he continued to work until his death, is based on minute particles streaming through space and pushing upon gross bodies, an idea that Fatio probably derived in part from his successful explanation of zodiacal light as sunlight scattered by a cloud of fine dust surrounding the Sun.

Fatio turned down Newton's offer to reside in Cambridge as his assistant, seeking instead academic preferment in the Netherlands. In the spring of 1690 he traveled to The Hague as tutor to two of John Hampden's nephews. There, Fatio shared with Huygens a list that he had compiled of errata to Newton's Principia.  Fatio and Huygens collaborated on problems relating to differential equations, gravity, and optics.  At this time, Huygens shared with Gottfried Leibniz some of Fatio's work on differential equations.  Fatio returned to London in September 1691, following the death of one of his pupils. He vied unsuccessfully for the Savilian Professorship of Astronomy at Oxford, a post that had been left vacant by the death of his friend Edward Bernard.

Fatio convinced Newton to write a new treatise on a general method of integration, De quadratura curvarum. Initially, he also expected to collaborate with Newton on a new edition of the Principia that would include Fatio's mechanical explanation of gravity.  By the end of 1691, Fatio realised that Newton would not proceed with that project, but he still hoped to collaborate with Newton on corrections to the text of the Principia. In a letter to Huygens, Fatio wrote, concerning those corrections, "I may possibly undertake it myself, as I know no one who so well and thoroughly understands a good part of this book as I do."

Newton and Fatio also corresponded extensively on alchemy between 1689 and 1694, with Fatio acting as an intermediary between Newton and an unnamed Huguenot alchemist, whom modern historians have tentatively identified as M. de Tegny, a captain in the infantry regiment led by Colonel François Dupuy de Cambon. By the summer of 1694, Fatio was employed as a tutor to Wriothesley Russell, the heir of the Duke of Bedford, a position for which he had been recommended by Locke. Fatio accompanied his pupil to Oxford and, during 1697–8, to Holland.

Role in Newton's quarrel with Leibniz 

As a result of reading Newton's De quadratura curvarum, Fatio became convinced that Newton had for some time had a complete understanding of the differential and integral calculus, rendering Fatio's own mathematical discoveries superfluous.  He reported as much to Huygens in 1692. In 1696, Johann Bernoulli, a close ally of Leibniz, posed the brachistochrone problem as a challenge to the mathematicians who claimed to understand the new calculus.  The problem was solved by Leibniz, Tschirnhaus, L'Hôpital, Jacob Bernoulli, and Newton.  In 1699, Fatio published Lineæ brevissimæ descensus investigatio geometrica duplex, cui addita est investigatio geometrica solidi rotundi in quo minima fiat resistentia ("A two-fold geometrical investigation of the line of briefest descent, to which is added a geometric investigation of the solid of revolution that produces the minimum resistance"), a pamphlet containing his own solutions to the brachistochrone and to another problem, treated by Newton in book II of the Principia (see Newton's minimal resistance problem), in what is now called the "calculus of variations".

In his book, Fatio drew attention to his own original work on the calculus from 1687, while stressing Newton's absolute priority and questioning the claims of Leibniz and his followers.

This provoked angry responses from Johann Bernoulli and Leibniz in the Acta Eruditorum.  Leibniz stressed that Newton himself had admitted in his Principia to Leibniz's independent discovery of the calculus. Fatio's reply to his critics was finally published, in abbreviated form, in 1701. Fatio also corresponded on the history of calculus and on his own theory of gravity with Jacob Bernoulli, by then estranged from his brother Johann. Fatio's writings on the history of the calculus are often cited as precursors to the bitter priority dispute that would erupt between Newton and Leibniz in the 1710s, after the Scottish mathematician John Keill effectively accused Leibniz of plagiarism.

Contributions to watchmaking 

In the 1690s, Fatio discovered a method for piercing a small and well-rounded hole in a ruby, using a diamond drill.  Such pierced rubies can serve as jewel bearings in mechanical watches, reducing the friction and corrosion of the watch's internal mechanism, and thereby improving both accuracy and working life.  Fatio sought unsuccessfully to interest Parisian watchmakers in his invention. Back in London, Fatio partnered with the Huguenot brothers Peter and Jacob Debaufre (or "de Beaufré"), who kept a successful watchmaking shop in Church Street, Soho. In 1704, Fatio and the Debaufres obtained a fourteen-year patent (no. 371) for the sole use in England of Fatio's invention relating to rubies. They later attempted unsuccessfully to have the patent extended to "the sole applying [of] precious and more common stones in Clocks and Watches".

In March 1705, Fatio exhibited specimens of watches thus jewelled to the Royal Society. The correspondence of Isaac Newton shows that in 1717 Fatio agreed to make a watch for Richard Bentley in exchange for a payment of £15, and that in 1724 he sought permission from Newton to use Newton's name in advertising his jewelled watches. Fatio's method for piercing rubies remained a speciality of English watchmaking until it was adopted in the Continent in 1768 by Ferdinand Berthoud. Jewel bearings are still used today in luxury mechanical watches.

Later life and death 
Fatio was in Switzerland in 1699, 1700, and 1701.  In Duillier he was reconciled to his father and collaborated with his brother Jean-Christophe in surveying the mountains around Lac Léman.  He also undertook a deep study of the prophetic books in the Bible.  Back in London, Fatio worked as a mathematical tutor in Spitalfields.  In 1706 he began to associate with the Camisards, a radical group of Huguenot exiles who had fled from France during the Wars of Religion in that country.  The group with which Fatio became affiliated was known as the "French prophets" and preached impending destruction and judgment.

The British government suspected the millenarian French prophets of contriving a political scheme, and in 1707 Élie Marion, Jean Daudé, and Fatio were tried before the Queen's Bench on charges brought against them by the mainstream Huguenot churches in London. The three were convicted of sedition and sentenced to the pillory. On 2 December, Fatio stood on a scaffold at Charing Cross with an inscription on his hat that read  By the influence of the Duke of Ormonde, to whose brother, Lord Arran, Fatio had been tutor, he was protected from the violence of the mob.

Fatio was among those who believed in the prophecy that Thomas Emes would be raised from the dead, attracting ridicule and condemnation even from his own brother.  In 1711 Fatio travelled to Berlin, Halle, and Vienna as a missionary of the French prophets.  A second mission in 1712–13 took him to Stockholm, Prussia, Halle, Constantinople, Smyrna, and Rome.  Fatio then moved to Holland, where he wrote accounts of his missions and of the prophecies delivered during them.  Some of these accounts, in French and Latin, were published in 1714.

Back in London, Fatio once again communicated with the Royal Society, of which his old friend Sir Isaac Newton had been president since 1704.  In 1717 Fatio presented a series of papers on the precession of the equinoxes and climate change, subjects that he regarded from both a scientific and a millenarian perspective.  In the spring of that same year he moved to Worcester, where he formed some congenial friendships and busied himself with scientific pursuits, alchemy, and study of the cabbala.  Fatio would spend the rest of his life in Worcester and nearby Madresfield.

After the death of Isaac Newton in 1727, Fatio composed a poetic hymn (eclogue) on Newton's genius, written in Latin and published in 1728.  According to modern Newton scholar Robert Iliffe, this is "the most interesting poetic response to Newton".  In 1732, Fatio collaborated with Newton's nephew-in-law and executor, John Conduitt, in the design of the funerary monument to Newton in Westminster Abbey, and in composing the inscription for it.  At that time, Fatio also sought Conduitt's help in his effort (which was ultimately unsuccessful) to obtain a belated reward for having saved the Prince of Orange from Count Fenil's kidnapping plot.

Fatio died on 28 April or 12 May 1753 in Madresfield and was buried at the church of St. Nicholas, Worcester. His compatriot Georges-Louis Le Sage later purchased many of his scientific papers which, together with those of Le Sage, are now in the Geneva Library.

Legacy

Inventions 

Throughout his long life Fatio proposed and developed various technological innovations.  Undoubtedly the most significant of these was the jewel bearing, still used today in the manufacture of luxury mechanical watches.  But Fatio's efforts as an inventor extended into many areas beyond watchmaking.

To optimise the capture of solar energy and thereby increase agricultural yields, Fatio suggested building sloping fruit walls, precisely angled to maximize the collection of heat from sunlight. Having supervised the building of such walls in Belvoir Castle, in 1699 he published an illustrated treatise that described his invention and included theoretical considerations about solar radiation.  That work appeared with the imprimatur of the Royal Society.  Fatio also proposed a tracking mechanism that could pivot to follow the Sun.  Such ideas were superseded by the development of modern greenhouses.

One must add to the catalogue of Fatio's inventions his early work on improving the grinding of lenses for the objectives of telescopes, as well as his later proposals for taking advantage of a ship's motion to grind corn, saw, raise anchors, and hoist rigging.  He also contrived a ship's observatory and measured the height of the mountains surrounding Geneva, planning, but never completing, a detailed map of Lac Léman.

Push-shadow gravity 

Fatio considered that his greatest work was his explanation of Newtonian gravity in terms of collisions between ordinary matter and aetherial corpuscles moving rapidly in all directions.  Fatio was motivated by Huygens's earlier work on a "mechanical" explanation of gravity in terms of contact interactions between ordinary matter and an aether, and perhaps also by the success of his explanation of zodiacal light as sunlight scattered by an interplanetary cloud of fine particles.  The need to make the collisions between ordinary matter and the aetherial corpuscles inelastic implied that Fatio's aetherial corpuscles must also exert a drag resistance on the motion of celestial bodies.  Fatio therefore failed to interest Huygens (who believed in the conservation of vis viva) in his proposal.  Huygens may also have found Fatio's theory uncongenial because it assumed an empty space in which the aetherial corpuscles moved, a view contrary to the plenism of Huygens and Leibniz, who conceived of the aether as a fluid pervading all of space.

Finding that the drag resistance was proportional to the product of the speed and the density of the aetherial corpuscles, while the gravitational attraction was proportional to the density and the square of the speed of the corpuscles, Fatio concluded that the drag could be made negligible by decreasing the density while increasing the speed.  However, despite some initial enthusiasm on the part of Newton and Halley, Fatio's theory of gravity soon fell into oblivion and Newton abandoned all attempts to explain gravity in terms of contact interactions.

Fatio corresponded about his theory with Jacob Bernoulli in 1700 and he continued to revise and promote his theory until the end of his life, but he never published that work.  A copy of Fatio's manuscript came to the attention of the Genevan mathematician Gabriel Cramer, who in 1731 published a dissertation containing a summary of Fatio's theory, without attribution.  Another Genevan, Georges-Louis Le Sage, independently re-discovered the same idea before Cramer introduced him to Fatio's work in 1749.  Since then, the corresponding theory has been commonly known as "Le Sage's theory of gravitation".

The success of the kinetic theory of gases contributed to reviving interest in the Fatio-Le Sage theory during the second half of the 19th century.  In 1878, James Clerk Maxwell characterized it as "the only theory of the cause of gravitation which has been so far developed as to be capable of being attacked and defended."  Another leading physicist who took this theory seriously was Nobel laureate J. J. Thomson.

Fatio's account of his gravitational theory finally published in 1929, in an edition prepared by the German historian of mathematics Karl Bopp, and then again independently in 1949 by Bernard Gagnebin, the conservator of manuscripts at the Geneva Library.  Even though the modern scientific consensus is that the Fatio-Le Sage theory is inviable as an account of gravity, the process that he described does give rise to an attractive inverse-square force between particles immersed in a rare medium at a higher temperature. George Gamow proposed in 1949 that such a "mock gravity" could have played a role in galaxy formation after the Big Bang.   A. M. Ignatov showed in 1996 that a similar process produces an attraction between dust grains in a dusty plasma.

Cultural references 
The Genevan naturalist Jean Senebier, writing thirty years after Fatio's death, declared that

Two scholarly biographies of Isaac Newton published in the 20th century, Frank E. Manuel's A Portrait of Isaac Newton (1968) and Richard S. Westfall's Never at Rest (1980) considered at length the personal relationship between Fatio and Newton.  Manuel and Westfall both suggested that there might have been a sentimental or sexual element to the attachment between both men, and that Newton's nervous breakdown in 1693 might have been connected with a rupture in that relationship.  A similar interpretation appears in Michael White's popular biography Isaac Newton: The Last Sorcerer (1997).  On the other hand, historian Scott Mandelbrote writes:

Mandelbrote's judgment has found support in later work by professional historians specializing on Newton, including Robert Iliffe and William R. Newman.  According to Newman,

Fatio's connection with Newton has been treated in several works of historical fiction.  He appears as a supporting character in Michael White's novel Equinox (2006), in Neal Stephenson's trilogy The Baroque Cycle (2003–04), and in Gregory Keyes's novel series The Age of Unreason (1998–2001).

Works

Books 
Fatio was the author of the following works, published in book form during his lifetime:

 Epistola de mari æneo Salomonis ("Letter on Solomon's Brazen Sea"), in Edward Bernard's De Mensuris et Ponderibus antiquis Libri tres ("On Ancient Measures and Weights, in three books"), 8vo, Oxford, 1688
 Lineæ brevissimæ descensus investigatio geometrica duplex, cui addita est investigatio geometrica solidi rotundi in quo minima fiat resistentia ("A two-fold geometrical investigation of the line of briefest descent, to which is added a geometric investigation of the solid of revolution that produces the minimum resistance"), 4to, London, 1699
 Fruit-walls improved by inclining them to the horizon, by a member of the Royal Society (signed N. F. D.), 4to, London, 1699
 N. Facii Duillerii Neutonus. Ecloga. ("N. Fatio de Duillier's Newton. Eclogue."), 8vo, Oxford, 1728
 Navigation improved: being chiefly the method for finding the latitude at sea as well as by land, by taking any proper altitudes, with the time between the observations, fol., London, 1728

With Jean Allut, Elie Marion, and other of the "French prophets", Fatio issued a prophecy with the title Plan de la Justice de Dieu sur la terre dans ces derniers jours et du relévement de la chûte de l'homme par son péché ("Plan of God's Justice upon the earth in these last days, and of the release of man's fall by his sin") 2 parts, 8vo, 1714, of which a Latin version appeared during the same year.

Periodicals 

In periodicals Fatio published the following works:

 Lettre sur la manière de faire des Bassins pour travailler les verres objectifs des Telescopes ("Letter on the manner of making basins for grinding the objective glasses of telescopes"), Journal des sçavans, Paris, 1684 
 Lettre à M. Cassini touchant une lumière extraordinaire qui paroît dans le Ciel depuis quelques années ("Letter to Mr. Cassini concerning the extraordinary light that has appeared in the Heavens for some years"), in Jean Leclerc's Bibliothèque Universelle et Historique, vol. III, Amsterdam, 1686
 Réflexions sur une méthode de trouver les tangentes de certaines lignes courbes, qui vient d'être publiée dans un livre intitulé: Medicina Mentis ("Reflections on a method for finding the tangents of certain curves, recently published in a book titled Medicina Mentis"), Bibliothèque Universelle et Historique, vol. V, 1687
 Excerpta ex suâ responsione ad excerpta ex litteris J. Bernouilli ("Excerpts from his response to excerpts from a letter by Johann Bernoulli"), Acta Eruditorum, Leipzig, 1700
 "Epistola ad fratrem Joh. Christoph. Facium, qua vindicat Solutionem suam Problematis de inveniendo solido rotundo seu tereti in quo minima fiat resistentia" ("Letter to his brother Jean Christophe Fatio, vindicating his solution to the problem of the solid of revolution that produces the minimum resistance"), Philosophical Transactions, vol. XXVIII, pp. 172–6, 1713
 "Four theorems, with their demonstration, for determining accurately the sun's parallax", Miscellanea curiosa mathematica, vol. II, no. 1 (London, 1745)

Fatio also contributed articles on astronomy and ancient Hebrew units of measurement to nearly every number of the Gentleman's Magazine for 1737–38.

Manuscripts 

Upon his death, Fatio left a number of manuscripts, some of which passed into the hands of Dr. James Johnstone of Kidderminster.  Others were acquired by Prof. Georges-Louis Le Sage of Geneva, who amassed a large collection of Fatio's letters, now at the Bibliothèque de Genève.  A few of Fatio's papers and letters are in the British Library. Among them is a Latin poem entitled N. Facii Duellerii Auriacus Throno-servatus ("N. Fatio de Duillier's Orange Throne Preserved", Addit. MS. 4163), containing a narrative of Count Fenil's plot against Prince William of Orange, as well as a description of Fatio's jewelled watches. A series of letters to Sir Hans Sloane (ib. 4044) extend from 1714 to 1736. Other letters of his are in fasciculus 2 of C. Hugenii aliorumque seculi xvii. virorum celebrium Exercitationes Mathematicæ et Philosophicæ, 4to, the Hague, 1833.

Posthumous publications 

Some of Fatio's letters were included in the correspondence volumes of the Oeuvres complètes ("Complete Works") of Christiaan Huygens (published between 1888 and 1950 by the Dutch Academy of Sciences) and in The Correspondence of Isaac Newton (published between 1959 and 1977 by the Royal Society).  Fatio's treatise describing his work on the push-shadow theory of gravity circulated during his lifetime only as a manuscript.  That work was published, long after his death, in two independent scholarly editions:

 
 

Even though it appeared twenty years earlier, Bopp's edition of Fatio's manuscript is the more complete of the two.

The full Latin text of Fatio's 1728 eclogue on Newton, along with an English translation and commentary, was published in:

Notes

Other sources

External links 
 Fatio de Duillier, N.: De la cause de la Pesanteur, 1690–1701, Bopp edition. On pp. 19–22 is an introduction by Bopp (in German). Fatio's paper starts at the end of p. 22 (in French).
 Fatio de Duillier, N.: De la Cause de la Pesanteur, 1690–1743, Gagnebin edition. For an introduction by Gagnebin, see Introduction
 Fatio de Duillier, N.: "Letters no. 2570, pp. 384–389 and 2582, pp. 407–412, 1690, Huygens Oeuvres, Vol. IX. These letters contain the first written expositions of his gravitational theory. Huygens gave an answer in letter no. 2572)
 MathPages – Nicolas Fatio and the Cause of Gravity

Mathematicians from the Republic of Geneva
18th-century Swiss mathematicians
17th-century scientists from the Republic of Geneva
18th-century scientists from the Republic of Geneva
Fellows of the Royal Society
Swiss Protestants
1664 births
1753 deaths
17th-century Swiss astronomers
18th-century Swiss inventors
Clockmakers from the Republic of Geneva
Scientists from Basel-Stadt
17th-century Swiss mathematicians
18th-century Swiss astronomers